Archbishop Nikon (secular name Nicholas Liolin; October 9, 1945 – September 1, 2019) was an Albanian bishop who served as the head of the Orthodox Church in America's Albanian Archdiocese and New England diocese.

Life of Archbishop Nikon 
Archbishop Nikon was born in New York City on October 9, 1945, the son of the late Evans J. and Helena P. Liolin. He was raised in a family nurtured in the Orthodox Christian faith and active in the Albanian Archdiocese of the Orthodox Church in America. His father had served as lay chairman and founder in 1947 of the Diocesan Theological Student Fund. For many years, his mother served as choir director at the family's home parish of Saint Nicholas, Jamaica Estates, New York. His brother John, now deceased, served on the parish council of Saint George Church, Trumbull, Connecticut, his brother Billy gave his life serving in the armed forces during the Korean War, while his youngest brother, James, served as lay chairman of the Jamaica Estates parish and member of the Archdiocesan Council's Student Fund. His elder brother, Father Arthur, is Chancellor of the Boston-based Albanian Archdiocese.

Archbishop Nikon pursued his elementary and secondary studies in New York City, where he developed an abiding interest in the theatre arts, securing leading roles in several high school productions, and in the biological sciences.

Tonsured to the Order of Reader by Metropolitan Theophan (Noli), Archbishop Nikon studied at Saint Vladimir's Orthodox Theological Seminary, Crestwood, New York; Iona and Concordia College, New Rochelle, New York; and the New School for Social Research and Political Science, New York City.

In 1967, he married Sarah Arthur, his childhood sweetheart. She served as choir director after his ordination to the Holy Diaconate by Bishop Stephen (Lasko) on July 5, 1969, and to the Holy Priesthood the following day. During his 33-year ministry Nikon served as rector of two parishes of the OCA's Albanian Archdiocese: Saint Nicholas Church, Southbridge, Massachusetts, and Saint Thomas Church, Farmington Hills, Michigan.

In addition to his pastoral ministry, Archbishop Nikon served as President of the Greater Detroit Council of Orthodox Churches and Chaplain for the Wayne State University Orthodox Christian Fellowship. He also administered a health and hospitalization insurance plan for area clergy. He also appeared on numerous live television and radio programs. He was a project coordinator for “The Voice of Orthodoxy”, established by New England's Russian Orthodox Layman's League, and he served as editor of “The Vine”, the newspaper of the Albanian Archdiocese, and Dean of the Great Lakes Deanery.

On July 25, 2000, his wife Sarah died of cancer. Metropolitan Theodosius presided at her funeral.

Prior to his consecration, Nikon spent time at Saint Tikhon's Seminary and Monastery, South Canaan, Pennsylvania, extending his studies, where he was tonsured to monastic orders prior to his episcopal consecration.

Archbishop Nikon was consecrated Bishop of Baltimore and Auxiliary to Metropolitan Theodosius on May 24 and 25, 2002, in conjunction with the annual pilgrimage to Saint Tikhon Monastery.

Nikon was nominated as Bishop of Boston at the Albanian Archdiocesan Assembly on October 10, 2003, and the Holy Synod elected him Bishop of Boston on October 22, 2003. He served as administrator of the Diocese of New England and was elected ruling bishop during the fall session of the Holy Synod in October 2005. He was installed with a new title as Bishop of Boston, New England and the Albanian Archdiocese by Metropolitan Herman at Holy Trinity Cathedral in Boston on December 16 and 17 2005. Bishop Nikon was elevated to Archbishop on May 9, 2012.

Nikon died September 1, 2019, in Southbridge, Massachusetts.

External links 
 Official site of the Diocese of New England
 Biography on oca.org
 2005 interview with Bishop Nikon
 Nikon (Liolin) of Boston

1945 births
2019 deaths
Clergy from New York City
21st-century Eastern Orthodox bishops
Bishops of the Orthodox Church in America
21st-century American clergy